Anitha R. Radhakrishnan is an Indian Tamil politician, Minister of Tamilnadu and Member of Tamil Nadu Legislative Assembly elected from Tiruchendur constituency as AIADMK candidate in 2001,2006 and as DMK candidate in 2009(Bye-election),2011,2016 and 2021. He was also former Minister for Animal Husbandry and Minister for Housing & Urban Development in the 2001 AIADMK government.

He was a member of the Anna Dravida Munnetra Kazhagam party in Tamil Nadu until being expelled for alleged anti-party activities on 30 July 2009 and resigned from his MLA Post after being expelled from AIADMK. After his expulsion from the AIADMK, Radhakrishnan accepted an invitation to join the Dravida Munnetra Kazhagam in 2009.

In the 2009 Bye-election, he again contest as a DMK Candidate and won in the Tiruchendur constituency

Even though there was an anti-incumbency wave against the DMK, he won the 2011 Assembly election in Tiruchendur constituency.

On 14 May 2015, Radhakrishnan was suspended by the DMK after he and A. Soundara Pandian greeted AIADMK leader Jayalalithaa after she was acquitted in the disproportionate asset case against her.

In the elections of 2016, Radhakrishnan won again in Tiruchendur, beating Sarath Kumar of the AISMK.

In 2021 assembly election , he again won from Tiruchendur constituency and he was appointed as Minister for Fisheries – Fishermen Welfare and Animal Husbandry.

References

External links
Tamil Nadu Government profile

Living people
All India Anna Dravida Munnetra Kazhagam politicians
Dravida Munnetra Kazhagam politicians
1952 births
Tamil Nadu MLAs 2001–2006
Tamil Nadu MLAs 2011–2016
Tamil Nadu MLAs 2016–2021
Tamil Nadu MLAs 2021–2026